Vyacheslav Ustinov (Russian: Вячеслав Устинов; born 10 May 1957) is a retired Russian/Soviet athlete who specialised in the sprint hurdles. He won a bronze medal at the Friendship Games, which were organised for countries boycotting the 1984 Summer Olympics. In addition, he won a bronze medal at the 1985 European Indoor Championships.

His personal bests are 13.57 seconds in the 110 metres hurdles (-0.6 m/s, Moscow 1984) and 7.66 seconds in the 60 metres hurdles (Chisinau 1985).

International competitions

References

1957 births
Living people
Russian male hurdlers
Soviet male hurdlers
Friendship Games medalists in athletics